Brian O'Sullivan (born 1990 in Ballygunner) is an Irish hurler who plays for both the Waterford Inter-county hurling team and the Ballygunner GAA club.

Playing career

Club
O'Sullivan has played with Ballygunner since an early age.

Inter-county
O'Sullivan started playing inter-county hurling with Waterford at the age of 18. O'Sullivan first broke into the team during the 2011 National Hurling League.  O'Sullivan made his championship debut on 12 June 2011 against Limerick GAA in the Munster Championship Semi-final at Semple Stadium, Thurles.  O'Sullivan scored 2 points from play.

Championship appearances

References

1990 births
Living people
Ballygunner hurlers
Waterford inter-county hurlers